Mayor Muthanna is a 1969 Indian Kannada-language film directed by Siddalingaiah. The film stars Rajkumar and Bharathi. The film was Siddalingaiah's debut as a director and actor Dwarkish's first independent production venture who had earlier co- produced the 1966 movie Mamatheya Bandhana with 2 other people under Thunga Pictures. The sub-plot of the film regarding the salvaging of the sub-standard grain was inspired by the 1886 novel The Mayor of Casterbridge by Thomas Hardy. The movie was remade in Telugu in 1974 as Chairman Chalamayya starring Chalam.

Cast
 Rajkumar as Mutthannaa
 M. P. Shankar as Rajappa
 Bharathi
 Kanchana
 Balakrishna
 T. B. Nagappa
 Thoogudeepa Srinivas as Sudhakar
 Dwarakeesh as ranga
 Niranjan
 Rajanand
 Sriram
 Ashwath Narayan
 Ramachandra Shastri
 Madevappa
 B. V. Radha as shanthi
 Vijayabhanu

Soundtrack
The music of the film was composed by the duo Rajan–Nagendra, with lyrics penned by Chi. Udaya Shankar.

References

External links
 

1969 films
1960s Kannada-language films
Films scored by Rajan–Nagendra
Films directed by Siddalingaiah
1969 directorial debut films
Kannada films remade in other languages